is a Japanese model, tarento and actress. She is represented by her agency Stardust Promotion and was the winner of the Miss Seventeen 2008 grand prix. She was an exclusive model for the fashion magazine JJ. Takizawa's father is Ukrainian, her mother is Japanese.

Life and career
Takizawa was scouted in Shibuya and entered the entertainment industry as a model. She entered and won the Miss Seventeen 2008 grand prix for the fashion magazine Seventeen in 2008 and began activities as an exclusive model. From 2009 to 2010, Takizawa starred in the live action films of Rookies: Graduation and Maria-sama ga Miteru.

In March 2011, she graduated from high school and from the fashion magazine Seventeen. A month later, she joined JJ as their exclusive model. In 2014, she moved agencies from Groovy Air to Stardust Promotion. Takizawa gained traction as a tarento for her appearance on Dancing Sanma Palace in June 2015, where her unique method of speech and choice of words was noticed. Since then, she has become an active television personality on various programs.

On July 23, 2019, Takizawa graduated from JJ as an exclusive model.

On July 4, 2022, Takizawa announced on her Instagram that she is married to a commoner.

References

External links
 Official Profile on Stardust Promotion
 Official Profile on JJ
 

Japanese television personalities
Japanese female models
21st-century Japanese actresses
1992 births
Living people
Stardust Promotion artists
People from Tokyo
Japanese people of Ukrainian descent
Models from Tokyo Metropolis